Nottingham Guildhall is a former magistrates' court in Nottingham, England. In the 1990s it was used by Nottingham City Council, and there were plans in the 2010s to convert the building into a luxury hotel.

History
Nottingham Guildhall was built in 1887 to 1888 to replace the previous Nottingham Guild Hall on Weekday Cross. Following a competition with Alfred Waterhouse as the judge, the French Renaissance Revival design by the architects Thomas Verity and George Henry Hunt was chosen. Gabbutts of Liverpool were chosen as contractors much to the annoyance of local building companies.

The initial estimate for the building was £128,416, and immediately the council asked Verity and Hunt to simplify the design. The building as erected contained the Police (magistrates') Court. the Central Police Station and the new Fire Station.

The building was erected in Darley Dale ashlar and brick, with Westmorland slate roofs for a cost of £65,000.

In 1996, all magistrates were moved to the new Nottingham Magistrates' Court building.

Between 1996 and 2010 the Guildhall was occupied by Nottingham City Council. In 2010 the council left for new, modern offices at Loxley House, close to Nottingham rail station. Since this date the building has remained council-owned but is relatively unused. The council aims to sell off the building, ideally to be converted into a luxury hotel.

Caves

The two-level cave system is reached by an open well stair. The brick-lined passages and cells were extensively modified during World War II for use as emergency headquarters and air raid shelters.

See also

Nottingham Magistrates' Court

References

Court buildings in England
Magistrates' courts in England and Wales
Buildings and structures in Nottingham
Grade II listed buildings in Nottinghamshire